The Panamint Range is a short rugged fault-block mountain range in the northern Mojave Desert, within Death Valley National Park in Inyo County, eastern California.  Dr. Darwin French is credited as applying the term Panamint in 1860 during his search for the fabled Gunsight Lode. The orographic identity has been liberally applied for decades to include other ranges.

The origin of the name is the Paiute or Koso word Panümünt or Pa (water) and nïwïnsti (person).

Geography
The range runs north–south for approximately  through Inyo County, forming the western wall of Death Valley and separating it from the Panamint Valley to the west.  The range is part of the Basin and Range Province, at the western end of the Great Basin.

Features
Both Mount Whitney above the Owens Valley and Badwater Basin in Death Valley are visible from certain vantage points in the Panamint Range, making it one of few places where one can simultaneously see both the highest and lowest points in the contiguous United States. Dante's View east of Death Valley is another.

Being a sky island habitat of the Mojave Desert, with more precipitation and temperature variation than the desert floor and hills, there are various plant and animal species endemic to the Panamint Range.

Mining
The Panamint Mining District is on the western side of the Panamint Range. Panamint City (est. 1873) was a mining town in the district, formerly in the central section of the range. The historic mining community of Ballarat (est. 1890s), also in the district, is now a ghost town.  The Gold Hill Mining District (est. 1875) was in the southwestern section of the range, at the northeast end of Butte Valley.

The Wildrose Charcoal Kilns (completed 1877) are ruins of charcoal kilns located near Wildrose Canyon in the northern range and within Death Valley National Park. They were built in 1877 by the Modock Consolidated Mining Company, to provide fuel for smelters near their lead and silver mines in the Argus Range.

See also

References

External links

 SummitPost.org: Panamint Range — Climbing, Hiking & Mountaineering 
 NPS.gov: Death Valley National Park Historic Resource Study (Section III, Panamint Range & West Side)

 
Death Valley
Mountain ranges of the Mojave Desert
Mountain ranges of Inyo County, California
Mountain ranges of Southern California
Death Valley National Park
Protected areas of the Mojave Desert